Guangdong Vermilion Birds is a Chinese professional women's basketball club based in Dongguan, Guangdong, playing in the Women's Chinese Basketball Association (WCBA). It was known as Guangdong Dolphins from 2007–2018 and Guangdong Kapok before 2007.

The Vermilion Bird is a mythical creature in Chinese culture.

Season-by-season records

Current players 

}
}
}
}

Notable former players

 Deanna Jackson (2002–05)
 Chasity Melvin (2008–09)
 Swin Cash (2009–12)
 Ashley Corral (2012)
 Tamika Catchings (2012–13)
 Aneika Henry (2014–15)
 Yelena Leuchanka (2015–17)
 Candace Parker (2016)
 Glory Johnson (2017)
 Amber Harris (2017–18)
 Yui Hanada (2009–10)
 Yang Ya-hui (2015–17)
 Xu Chunmei (2002)
 Pan Wei (2002–05)
 Song Xiaoyun (2002–09)
 Guan Xin (2004–13)
 Wei Wei (2004–14)
 Huang Hongpin (2007–14, 2017–18)

References 

 
Women's Chinese Basketball Association teams